The 2019 Mercer Tennis Classic was a professional tennis tournament played on outdoor hard courts. It was the seventh edition of the tournament which was part of the 2019 ITF Women's World Tennis Tour. It took place in Macon, Georgia, United States between 21 and 27 October 2019.

Singles main-draw entrants

Seeds

 1 Rankings are as of 14 October 2019.

Other entrants
The following players received wildcards into the singles main draw:
  Katerina Stewart
  CoCo Vandeweghe
  Sophia Whittle
  Alexandra Yepifanova

The following players received entry from the qualifying draw:
  Elysia Bolton
  Irina Falconi
  Anzhelika Isaeva
  Sanaz Marand
  Ingrid Neel
  Estela Pérez-Somarriba
  Gabriella Price
  Andrea Renée Villarreal

Champions

Singles

 Katerina Stewart def.  Shelby Rogers, 6–7(2–7), 6–3, 6–2

Doubles

 Usue Maitane Arconada /  Caroline Dolehide def.  Jaimee Fourlis /  Valentini Grammatikopoulou, 6–7(2–7), 6–2, [10–8]

References

External links
 2019 Mercer Tennis Classic at ITFtennis.com
 Official website

2019 ITF Women's World Tennis Tour
2019 in American tennis
October 2019 sports events in the United States